Stretford is a small village in Herefordshire, England in the civil parish of Monkland and Stretford, about  west of Leominster. The population information can be found under the civil parish.

The most notable building in the village is the Grade I listed St Cosmas and St Damian's Church, Stretford.

References

External links

Villages in Herefordshire